BIT Numerical Mathematics is a quarterly peer-reviewed mathematics journal that covers research in numerical analysis. It was established in 1961 by Carl Erik Fröberg and is published by Springer Science+Business Media. The name "BIT" is a reverse acronym of Tidskrift för Informationsbehandling (Swedish: Journal of Information Processing).

Previous editors-in-chief have been Carl Erik Fröberg (1961-1992), Åke Björck (1993-2002), Axel Ruhe (2003-2015), and Lars Eldén (2016).  the editor-in-chief is Gunilla Kreiss.

Peter Naur served as a member of the editorial board between the years 1960 and 1993, and Germund Dahlquist between 1962 and 1991.

Abstracting and indexing 
The journal is abstracted and indexed in:

According to the Journal Citation Reports, the journal has a 2020 impact factor of 1.663.

References

External links 
 

Mathematics journals
Publications established in 1961
Springer Science+Business Media academic journals
English-language journals
Quarterly journals